Ella Summer Purnell (born 17 September 1996) is an English actress. She began her career as a child actress on the West End and in the films Never Let Me Go (2010), Intruders (2011), Wildlike and Maleficent (both 2014).

On television, Purnell went on to star in the BBC drama Ordeal by Innocence (2018), the Starz series Sweetbitter (2018–2019), the ITV miniseries Belgravia (2020), and the Showtime thriller Yellowjackets (2021–).

Her films include Miss Peregrine's Home for Peculiar Children (2016), Churchill (2017), and Army of the Dead (2021). She voiced Jinx in the Netflix series Arcane and Gwyn in the Paramount+–Nickelodeon series Star Trek: Prodigy (both 2021).

Early life
Ella Summer Purnell was born in the Whitechapel area of East London on 17 September 1996 and raised in Bethnal Green. She attended Bethnal Green Montessori, Forest School, the City of London School for Girls, and the Young Actors Theatre Islington. She also attended weekly classes at the Sylvia Young Theatre School, studying acting, singing, and dance, and was represented by their in-house talent agency.

Career

Film
In 2008, Purnell beat hundreds of other girls for a role in Oliver! at London's Theatre Royal, Drury Lane. Towards the end of her time in Oliver!, she won the role of Young Ruth (played by Keira Knightley as an adult) in Mark Romanek's Never Let Me Go – a feature film based on the book by Kazuo Ishiguro. It was released in 2010 to positive reviews. She was then cast as Kayleigh in Gustavo Ron's Ways to Live Forever, adapted from the book by Sally Nicholls, and as Mia in the Juan Carlos Fresnadillo film Intruders. Purnell was named by Screen International as one of 10 UK Stars of Tomorrow. She also appeared in the BBC HD film short Candy in June 2011.

In 2013, Purnell appeared in the feature film Kick-Ass 2 as the character Dolce. The following year, she starred in the independent film WildLike, which earned her a number of accolades at film festivals, and played the teenage version of Angelina Jolie's titular character in Disney's Maleficent. In 2016, Purnell starred in Tim Burton's adaptation of Miss Peregrine's Home for Peculiar Children, based on the novel of the same name, by Ransom Riggs. In 2017, she played Mia in Access All Areas. Later that year, Purnell appeared in the historical drama film Churchill, playing Winston Churchill's secretary Helen Garrett.

Television 
In 2018, Purnell appeared as Hester Argyll in the BBC mini-series Ordeal By Innocence, based on the Agatha Christie book of the same name. Later that year, Purnell starred in the leading role of the Starz show Sweetbitter, based on Stephanie Danler's novel of the same name. She played Tess, a naive 22-year-old who moves to New York City to pursue a new life, and gets caught up in the world of fine dining. It was announced in December 2019 that Starz had cancelled the series. In 2020, Purnell played Lady Maria Grey in Julian Fellowes's period drama Belgravia, co-produced by ITV and Epix. In 2021, she began starring as Jackie in the Showtime drama series Yellowjackets. Later that year she voiced Gwyn in the animated series Star Trek: Prodigy and Jinx in the Netflix animated series Arcane.

Personal life
As of 2019, Purnell resides in Los Angeles, California.

Filmography

Film

Television

Stage

Video games

Awards and nominations

References

External links
 
 

1996 births
Living people
Actresses from London
Annie Award winners
English child actresses
English film actresses
English stage actresses
English voice actresses
People educated at the City of London School for Girls
People from Bethnal Green
People from Whitechapel
21st-century English actresses